The Mayor of Gloucester is the first citizen of the City of Gloucester, England, and acts as Chair of the council. The Mayor represents the Council and the City at civic, ceremonial and community events both inside the City boundaries and elsewhere.

The first recorded mayor of Gloucester was Richard the Burgess, who derived his authority from a royal order in 1228. No further use of the title is recorded until the Letters Patent of Richard III in October 1483, whereby the burgesses of Gloucester were given the right to elect their first mayor. The first mayor to be so elected was John Trye.

Prior to 21st century

1501–02: John Cooke, mercer, also 1507, 1512 and 1519. In his will he directed his wife to establish a school which continues today as The Crypt School.
1503–04: William Hanshaw, bellfounder, also 1508, 1509 and 1515
1504–05: William Cole
1505–06: Garret or Gerard Vanecke
1506–07: Thomas Telowe or Taylowe, 1513 and 1522
1507–08: John Cooke, mercer
1508–10: William Hanshaw
1511–12: Thomas Porter, MP for Gloucester, 1515
1512–13: John Cooke, mercer
1513–14: Thomas Telowe or Taylowe
1515–16: William Hanshaw
1516–17: Ralph Sankey
1519–20: John Cooke, mercer
1522–23: Thomas Telowe or Taylowe
1523–24: William Hasard
1524–25: John Rawlins, MP for Gloucester, 1529
1532: William Matthews 
1536–37: Thomas Bell, MP for Gloucester, also 1545, 1547, 1553 and 1554
1538 William Matthews 
1543–44: Thomas Bell the younger
1544–45: Thomas Bell
1546–47: Thomas Loveday, MP for Gloucester, 1553 and 1554
1552–53: Thomas Payne
1553–54: Thomas Bell
1555–56: Thomas Loveday
1565–66: Thomas Semys, MP for Gloucester, 1572
1569–70: William Massinger, MP for Gloucester, 1554, 1555 and 1571
1566-67: John Woodward
1567-8: Henry Kinge
1568-69: John Kirbie
1569-70: William Massinger
1570-71: Luke Garnons
1571-72: Thomas Wicks
1572-73: Peter Rumney
1573-74: Richard Cugley
1574-75: Thomas Francomb
1575-76: James Morse
1576-77: John Kirbie
1578–79: Thomas Semys
1579–80: Thomas Machen, MP for Gloucester, 1614
1580-81: Thomas Lane
1581-82: John Smith
1582-83: Lawrence Holliday
1583-84: Thomas Best
1585–86: William Massinger
1586-87: Luke Garnons
1587-88: John Cowdale
1588–89: Thomas Machen
1589-90: John Browne
1590-91: Richard Webb
1591-92: Richard Cox
1592-93: Robert Walkely
1593-94: John Taylor
1594-95: Henry Hassard
1595-96: Richard Webb
1596-97: Grumbald Hitchins
1597–98: John Jones, MP for Gloucester, 1604
1598–99: Christopher Caple, MP for Gloucester, 1625 and 1626
1599–1600: Thomas Semys
1600-01: Luke Garnons
1601–02: Thomas Machen
1602-03: Richard Cox
1603-04: Thomas Riche
1604-05: Henry Hassard
1605-06: Henry Darby
1606-07: Lawrence Wilshire
1607-08: John Baughe
1608-09: John Brewster
1609-10: John Thorne
1610–11: John Browne, MP for Gloucester six times from 1614 to 1628
1611-12: William Hill
1612-13: Thomas Addams
1613-14: John Tailor
1614-15: Edmond Clements
1615-16: Richard Smith
1616-17: Galfridus Beale
1618–19: John Jones
1619-20: Christopher Caple
1620-21: John Baugh
1621-22: John Browne
1622-23: William Hill
1623-24: Edmond Clements
1624-25: Richard Smyth
1625–26: John Jones
1626-27: Matthew Price
1627-28: Richard Beard, Mercer
1629–30: Anthony Robinson, MP for Gloucester, 1621 and 1624
1637–38: William Singleton, MP for Gloucester, 1640
1645–46: Laurence Singleton, MP for Gloucester, 1659
1649–50: James Stephens, MP for Gloucester, 1656, 1659 and 1660
1651–52: William Singleton
1653–54: Thomas Pury, MP for Gloucester, 1640–1659
1660: Thomas Yate
1672–73: Henry Norwood, MP for Gloucester, 1675
1675–76: William Selwyn, Governor of Jamaica, 1702
1690–91: Sir John Guise, 2nd Baronet, MP for Gloucestershire, 1681 and 1689–1695
1692–93: Robert Payne, MP for Gloucester, 1695
1703–04: Robert Payne
1727–28: John Selwyn, MP for Gloucester, 1734–51
1734–35: John Selwyn
1736–37: Charles Selwyn, MP for Gloucester, 1728–34
1758–59: George Augustus Selwyn, MP for Gloucester, 1754–80 
1765–66: George Augustus Selwyn, MP for Gloucester, 1754–80
1770–71: John Webb, MP for Gloucester, 1780–95
1776–77: John Webb
1786–87: John Webb
1893(START AND END DATE UNKNOWN) J.A.MATTHEWS (From a medal commemorating a marriage July 6, 1893)
1858-59: Richard Helps Solicitor 
1901–02: Samuel Bland, newspaper owner
1902-03: Alderman E. Sidney Hartland (Liberal)
1919-23: John Owen Roberts
1923-24: Charles Edward Gardner
1924-25: Fredrick William Duart-Smith
1925-26: William Jones
1926-27: Douglas Edward Finley
1927-28: William Charles Matthews
1928-29: John Owen Roberts
1929-30: Sydney John Gillett
1930-31: William Russel Eggerton
1931-32: Alfred Daniels & Sydney John Gillett
1932–33: William Levason Edwards
1933–34: Theodore Hannam-Clarke
1954-55: Howard A. Gibson
1955-56: E. J. Langdon
1956-67: M. G. Lewis
1958: Gordon Edgar Payne
1964-65: W. J. Lewis
1965–66: Lilian Embling, the first female mayor
1969-70: Leslie Robert Jones, BA (Hons)
1971–72: Keith Fisher
1998–99: Janet Lugg

21st century
2000–01: Terry Haines
2001–02: Rose Workman
2002–03: Pamela Tracey
2003–04: Phillip McLellan
2004–05: Geraldene Gillespie
2005–06: Lise Noakes
2006–07: Sue Blakeley
2007–08: Harjit Singh Gill, the first Asian mayor
2008–09: Norman Ravenhill 
2009–10: Chris Witts
2010–11: Jan Lugg
2011–12: Andy Lewis
2012–13: David Brown, husband of Joanne Brown
2013–14: Chris Chatterton
2014–15: Deb Llewellyn 
2015–16: Sebastian Field 
2016–17: Neil Hampson 
2017–18: Steve Morgan 
2018-19: Joanne Brown, wife of David Brown
2019-20: Colin Organ
2020-21: Kate Haigh  first Mayor elected at a virtual meeting.
2021-22: Collette Finnegan 
2022-  Howard Hyman

References

Gloucester
 
Mayors of Gloucester